Svenska Serien 1922–23, part of the 1922–23 Swedish football season, was the ninth Svenska Serien season played. The league was divided into two regional divisions with AIK and GAIS winning the eastern and western divisions. GAIS won the competition after defeating AIK in a final play-off.

League tables

Östra

Västra

Championship play-offs

Relegation play-offs

References 

Print

Online

Notes 

1922-23
Sweden
1